Joseph C. Shaughnessy (August 5, 1920 – July 23, 1985), better known as Mickey Shaughnessy, was an  American actor and comedian.

Early life 
Joseph C. Shaughnessy was born in New York City. He began in show business working as a singer at resorts, and became a comedian when he saw that the pay was better. He also was a Golden Gloves boxer. 

He served in World War II and appeared in a U.S. Army revue called "Stars and Gripes".  After the war, a Columbia Pictures producer saw him performing on stage and offered him a screen test. His screen debut was in the 1952 film The Marrying Kind.

Career 
Shaughnessy, who was six feet tall and weighed 210 pounds, played "tough, colorful characters" in films like From Here to Eternity, where he played the amiable Sergeant Leva. He also appeared in Jailhouse Rock as Elvis Presley's character's prison mentor, and in Designing Woman (1957) as a punch-drunk ex-boxer who could only sleep with his eyes open.

As a performer, he won critical praise for roles that might have otherwise been overlooked. Writing in The New York Times, film critic Bosley Crowther said that Shaughnessy's role in The Sheepman (1958) was the "item to be most grateful for", and called him ''a slag heap of pot-belly, wounded dignity and scowls.''

His final roles included a part in Walt Disney’s The Boatniks.  He also appeared in the 1971 series Chicago Teddy Bears, a  comedy about a speakeasy in the 1920s.

According to the Los Angeles Times, Shaughnessy once said that he always kept in mind "the old Irishman--the guy who refuses the dentist's Novocain. He sits there and takes out his rosary and offers up the pain for his sins."

He also worked in radio and television and had a nightclub act.

Later years 
In his later years, Shaughnessy lived in Wildwood, New Jersey. He continued his nightclub act until nearly the end of his life. He died July 23, 1985, aged 64, in Cape May Court House, New Jersey of lung cancer. He was survived by his wife Sarah, his sister Alice Shaughnessy, four daughters and three sons.

Credits

Feature films 

The Princess and the Pirate (1944) – Man who brings the beers (uncredited)
The Marrying Kind (1952) – Pat Bundy
Last of the Comanches (1953) – Rusty Potter
From Here to Eternity (1953) – Sgt. Leva
Conquest of Space (1955) – Sgt. Mahoney
Designing Woman (1957) – Maxie Stultz
The Burglar (1957) – Dohmer
Slaughter on Tenth Avenue (1957) – Solly Pitts
Until They Sail (1957) – US Marine, Store Customer
Jailhouse Rock (1957) – Hunk Houghton
Don't Go Near the Water (1957) – Farragut Jones
The Sheepman (1958) – Jumbo McCall
Gunman's Walk (1958) – Deputy Sheriff Will Motely
A Nice Little Bank That Should Be Robbed (1958) – Harold 'Rocky' Baker
The Hangman (1959) – Al Cruse
Ask Any Girl (1959) – Mr. Eager – Man Smoking Cigarette (uncredited)
Don't Give Up the Ship (1959) – Stan Wychinski
Edge of Eternity (1959) – Scotty O'Brien
The Adventures of Huckleberry Finn (1960) – The Duke
College Confidential (1960) – Sam Grover
Sex Kittens Go to College (1960) – Boomie
North to Alaska (1960) – Peter Boggs
Dondi (1961) – Sergeant
The Big Bankroll (1961) – Jim Kelly
The McGonicle (1961 TV movie) – Mac McGonicle
Pocketful of Miracles (1961) – Junior
How the West Was Won (1962) – Deputy Stover
Mickey and the Contessa (1963 TV movie) – Mickey Brennan
A Global Affair (1964) – Police Officer Dugan
A House Is Not a Home (1964) – Police Sergeant Riordan
Never a Dull Moment (1968) – Francis
St. Patrick's Day TV Special (1969)
Vernon's Volunteers (1969 TV movie)
The Boatniks (1970) – Charlie
Touched (1983) – Himself

Television
Alcoa Presents: One Step Beyond (1960, episode "The Clown") – Pippo the Clown
Maverick (1962, episode "Mr. Muldoon's Partner") – Mr. Muldoon
The Virginian (1962, episode "Big Day, Great Day") – Muldoon (credited as Michael Shaughnessy)
Going My Way (1963, episode "The Slasher") – Jim Bancroft
Laredo (1965, episode "Pride of the Rangers") – Monahan
The Legend of Jesse James (1966, episode "South Wind") – Ab Truxton
Run for Your Life (1967, episode "Rendezvous in Tokyo") – Morgan
The Chicago Teddy Bears (1971, three episodes) – Lefty

References

External links
 
 
 
 "My Memories of Mickey Shaughnessy" by Steve Murray

1920 births
1985 deaths
Male actors from New Jersey
Male actors from New York (state)
American male film actors
American male television actors
American people of Irish descent
Deaths from cancer in New Jersey
Deaths from lung cancer
People from Wildwood, New Jersey
20th-century American male actors